The Pagashi River is a river in northeastern Kenora District in northwestern Ontario, Canada. It is in the James Bay drainage basin and is a left tributary of the Albany River.

The Pagashi River begins at an unnamed lake and flows northeast to its mouth at the Albany River, which flows to James Bay.

References

Sources

Rivers of Kenora District